Green Township is one of the sixteen townships of Wayne County, Ohio, United States.  The 2000 census found 12,194 people in the township, 7,078 of whom lived in the unincorporated portions of the township.

Geography
Located in the central part of the county, it borders the following townships:
Milton Township - north
Chippewa Township - northeast corner
Baughman Township - east
Sugar Creek Township - southeast corner
East Union Township - south
Wooster Township - southwest corner
Wayne Township - west
Canaan Township - northwest corner

Two municipalities are located in Green Township: part of the city of Orrville in the east, and the village of Smithville in the west.

Name and history
It is one of sixteen Green Townships statewide.

Government
The township is governed by a three-member board of trustees, who are elected in November of odd-numbered years to a four-year term beginning on the following January 1. Two are elected in the year after the presidential election and one is elected in the year before it. There is also an elected township fiscal officer, who serves a four-year term beginning on April 1 of the year after the election, which is held in November of the year before the presidential election. Vacancies in the fiscal officership or on the board of trustees are filled by the remaining trustees.

References

External links
Wayne County township map
County website

Townships in Wayne County, Ohio
Townships in Ohio